Hades 2 is a first-person shooter developed by Espaço Informática, a Brazilian company.  Espaço Informática placed Hades 2 in the public domain and offered a Freeware download of the game on 20 September 2009 to celebrate the project's 10th anniversary.
On the game's opening screen, users can select to play the game in English or Portuguese.  The distribution package includes a Portuguese-language manual in Firefox Document format.

Hades 2 was Espaço Informática's biggest hit, selling over 50,000 copies in Brazil with additional distribution in Europe.

Plot

Located on the planet Pluto, Antauros is one of the Universal Federation's most important bases.  In the year 2356, the Grogr army invades Antauros.  The player must defend Antauros by completing missions assigned by the Central Command.

Gameplay

Within the game, the player can set "Difficulty" via a slider in the "Options" screen.

A game can be saved / loaded at any point during game play; Hades 2 provides 10 "Save" slots.

The player cannot modify Hades 2s controls.  A 3-page, in-game "Help" screen clearly lists the control keys.  A "Use" command does not exist. Instead, doors open and switches engage automatically when the character approaches closely enough.

The player can access some areas of the level only by breaking a window.  Although a map exists, it is not available by default; the player must enter a cheat code to enable the map.

The game environment includes objects (e.g. weapons, ammunition, keys, health batteries, etc.) that the player can pick up simply by walking over the object.  Even when the character has full health (100), health batteries will be picked up and held in reserve, automatically replenishing the character's health as damage occurs.

Battles exhibit unusual realism.  When hit by an enemy attack, the character gets knocked aside, which throws off the character's own aim in the battle.

After the player completes a level, Hades 2 displays this statistics screen:'''

{| class="wikitable"
|-
| Time || xx min. || amount of time required to complete the level
|-
| Enemies Killed || xx/yy || killed xx enemies from a total of yy enemies in the level
|-
| Secrets || x/y || discovered x secret areas from a total of y secret areas in the level
|-
| Discharged Shots || xxx || number of times the player fired a weapon
|-
| Right Shots || xxx || number of discharged shots that struck an enemy
|-
| Inhabitants saves || x/y || saved x Antauros citizens from a total of y Antauros citizens who were being attacked by an enemy
|-
| POINTS || xxxxx || the player's score for the level (according to an unknown formula)
|}Hades 2 has a few shortcomings:

 On some video cards, a regularly occurring graphics problem causes images to appear with only two colors.  However, it does not hinder game play.

 Development 

Mauricio Lucas, who was responsible for the artwork in Hades 2'', created sprites for some characters by recording images of other team members dressed in costumes.

See also 
 Category:Espaço Informática games (Categoria:Jogos da Espaço Informática) on Português Wikipedia
 List of video games produced in Brazil (Lista de jogos eletrônicos produzidos no Brasil) on Português Wikipedia

References

External links 
 Download Hades 2 (full version) for free on the website of Espaço Informática
 Hades 2 pages on the website of Espaço Informática
 Espaço Informática website

First-person shooters
Video games developed in Brazil
Windows games
Windows-only games
1999 video games
Freeware games
Video games with 2.5D graphics
Sprite-based first-person shooters
3D GameStudio games